Robert Kevin Appier (born December 6, 1967) is an American former professional baseball player. He played in Major League Baseball as a right-handed pitcher for the Kansas City Royals, Oakland Athletics, New York Mets, and Anaheim Angels. His fastball, tight slider and nasty forkball contributed to impressive pitching statistics, distinguishing himself as one of the American League's top right-handed starting pitchers throughout much of the 1990s. He was a starting pitcher on the World Series Champion Anaheim Angels in  before retiring four seasons later.

Kansas City Royals
Appier had a strong rookie campaign for the Royals in 1990, going 12-8 and posting the league's fourth-best ERA (2.76), thus earning him Rookie Pitcher of the Year honors. In , he had 13 wins (tied for the team best), and pitched 3 shutouts, two of which were back to back against the Boston Red Sox and New York Yankees. Highlights of the season included a career-high nine-game winning streak and the American League Pitcher of the Month award for July, in which he went 4–0 with a 1.55 ERA. In , Appier posted an 18–8 record with an AL leading 2.56 ERA, set a club record of 33 consecutive scoreless innings, and finished third in Cy Young Award balloting. In , he was selected for his only All-Star team, pitching 2 perfect innings for the American League. Appier suffered through his first sub-.500 season in 1997, despite posting a 3.40 ERA (7th best in AL)

Despite being one of the better pitchers in baseball during this time period, his accomplishments went largely unnoticed due to playing for the Royals, a small market team that was generally not in contention during Appier's tenure.  In , under the promise of the team's improvement, he signed a long-term extension.  During that offseason, he suffered a fall at his home resulting in a separated clavicle.  Though he recovered from that injury, in March 1998 he needed surgery for an unrelated long-term progressing shoulder ailment, the repair of a torn labrum, causing him to miss nearly the entire 1998 season. In , after losing faith in the direction of the Royals organization and eager to play with a contender, Appier requested to be traded. In the middle of the 1999 season, Appier was dealt to the Oakland A's for three pitchers, Jeff D'Amico, Brad Rigby and Blake Stein.

Oakland Athletics
Despite a good showing, he lost his only start in that year's ALDS when the Athletics were shut out. In Game 5, after the Yankees scored 6 runs in the first inning, Appier (for the first time in 10 years) came in to relieve in the 2nd inning, pitching four innings and allowing one run. For the series, Appier posted a 3.48 ERA with 13 strikeouts in 10.1 innings pitched.

New York Mets
A free agent after the season, Appier signed a four-year, $42 million contract with the New York Mets, with which he tied for the team lead in wins, going 11–10 with a 3.57 ERA and went undefeated in his final 12 appearances, going 6-0 during that span. Making a playoff push, the Mets went 6–0 in his final six starts with Appier going 4–0 with a 1.87 ERA.

Anaheim Angels
After the one season campaign in New York, Appier was traded to Anaheim for Mo Vaughn. In Game Two of the ALDS, Appier went 5 innings, giving up 3 runs, and left the game leading 4–3, but received a no-decision in an Angels victory after a blown save by Francisco Rodríguez. In Game One of the ALCS, Appier went 5 innings in a 2–1 loss against the Minnesota Twins. He also started Game Five, going  innings and leaving with the Angels leading 3–2 in the game that sent Anaheim to the World Series, though he once again did not receive the decision. He finished the ALCS with a 3.48 ERA. Starting Game Two of the World Series, Appier did not factor into the decision after allowing 5 runs in two innings, as the Angels went on to win the game 11–10. With the Angels facing elimination, Appier started Game Six, pitching four innings of shutout ball before yielding a two-run home run in the fifth inning, and leaving with a man on base who eventually scored via stolen base and wild pitch off Francisco Rodriguez, leaving him with an 11.37 ERA for the Series, which the Angels won in seven games.

Return to Kansas City
In , Appier was plagued with a previously undiagnosed flexor tendon injury and was eventually released at the end of July. He signed with the Royals, but after five starts needed surgery. In October, Appier applied for reinstatement with Major League Baseball and signed a minor-league contract with the Seattle Mariners. During 10 games with the AAA Tacoma Rainiers, Appier was 1–2 with a 4.54 ERA. On June 3, Appier asked for and was granted his release by the Mariners, officially retiring the next month.

In 2011, Appier was inducted into the Kansas City Royals Hall of Fame. During his 13 seasons with Kansas City, he accumulated an overall record of 115–92 with and ERA of 3.49 over the course of 287 games.

See also
 List of Major League Baseball annual ERA leaders
 List of Major League Baseball single-inning strikeout leaders
 List of Major League Baseball career strikeout leaders

References

External links

1967 births
Living people
Kansas City Royals players
Oakland Athletics players
New York Mets players
Anaheim Angels players
Major League Baseball pitchers
Baseball players from California
American League All-Stars
American League ERA champions
Eugene Emeralds players
Baseball City Royals players
Memphis Chicks players
Omaha Royals players
Gulf Coast Royals players
Lansing Lugnuts players
Wichita Wranglers players
Tacoma Rainiers players
People from Lancaster, California
Antelope Valley High School alumni
Antelope Valley Marauders baseball players
Indios de Mayagüez players